Phoebe or Phœbe is a female given name, feminine form of the male name Phoebus, an epithet of Apollo meaning "bright", "shining".

In Greek mythology, Phoebe was a Titan associated with the power of prophecy as well as the moon. This was also an epithet of her granddaughter Artemis. A moon of Saturn bears this name in honor of the Titan. This name also appears in Paul the Apostle's Epistle to the Romans in the New Testament, where it belonged to a female minister in the church at Kechries.

An alternate spelling is Phebe.

People
Phoebe Brand (1907–2004), American actress who was blacklisted during the McCarthy era
Phoebe Bridgers (born 1994), American musician
Phoebe Brown (born 1991), English singer              
Phoebe Campbell (1847–1872), Canadian murderer
Phoebe Carrai (born 1955), American cellist
Phoebe Cary (1824–1871), American poet
Phoebe Cates (born 1963), American actress
Phoebe Conn (born 1941), American author
Phoebe Couzins (1848–1912), one of the first female lawyers in the U.S. and the first female marshal
Phoebe Di Tommaso (born 1990), Australian figure skater
Phoebe Doty (died 1849), American prostitute
Phoebe Dynevor (born 1995), English actress
Phoebe Ephron (1914–1971), American playwright and screenwriter
Phoebe Gilman (1940–2002), American children's book author and illustrator
Phoebe Gloeckner (born 1960), American cartoonist, illustrator, painter, and novelist
Phoebe Hearst (1842–1919), American philanthropist and feminist
Phoebe Hesketh (1909–2005), English poet
Phoebe Hessel (1713–1821), British soldier who disguised herself as a man to serve in army
Phoebe Hirsch (born 1949), former member of SDS and Weatherman
Phoebe Judson (1831–1926), American pioneer and author
Phoebe Knapp (1839–1908), American composer
Phoebe Kreutz, singer-songwriter
Phoebe Legere, multi-format artist
Phoebe Mills (born 1972), American attorney and athlete active in multiple sports
Phoebe Nicholls (born 1957), English film, television, and stage actor
Phoebe Omlie (1902–1975), American aviation pioneer and one of the first female aviators
Phoebe Palmer (1807–1874), evangelist, writer, and promoter of the doctrine of Christian perfection
Phoebe Pember (1823–1913), nurse and medical administrator during the American Civil War
Phoebe Philo (born 1973), British fashion designer and previous creative director of Celine
Phoebe Prince (1994–2010), bullying victim
Phoebe Ryan (born 1990), American singer and songwriter
Phoebe Snetsinger, née Burnett (1931–1999), American birder
Phoebe Snow (1950–2011), musician
Phoebe Strole (born 1983), American actress and singer
Phoebe Atwood Taylor (1909–1976), American mystery author
Phoebe Thomas (born 1983), British actress
Phoebe Tonkin (born 1989), Australian actress and model
Phoebe Anna Traquair (1852–1936), Irish artist noted for her role in the Arts and Crafts Movement
Phoebe Wahl illustrator, sculptor and children's book author from the United States
Phoebe Waller-Bridge (born 1985), English actress, writer, playwright and director
Phoebe Holcroft Watson (1898–1980), English tennis player

Biblical and mythological figures
 Phoebe (biblical figure), a woman mentioned in Romans 16:1
 Phoebe (Greek myth), various figures

Fictional characters

In books
 Phoebe Somerville Calebow, the protagonist of Susan Elizabeth Phillips' It Had to Be You and main character in the Chicago Stars series
 Phoebe Caulfield, the little sister of Holden Caulfield in The Catcher in the Rye
 The title character of Phoebe Daring, a mystery novel by L. Frank Baum
 Phoebe Henry, a child born with down syndrome in The Memory Keeper's Daughter
 Phoebe Meryll, the daughter of Sergeant Meryll in the comic opera The Yeomen of the Guard by Gilbert and Sullivan
 Phoebe Pyncheon, a young vivacious female country cousin in The House of the Seven Gables
 Phoebe Winterbottom, the best friend of Salmanca Tree Hiddle in Walk Two Moons
 Phoebe, a demigod briefly described in The Titan's Curse, the third novel in Rick Riordan's series Percy Jackson & the Olympians
 Phoebe, a Sister of the Light in The Sword of Truth series by Terry Goodkind
 Phoebe the Fashion Fairy, in the Rainbow Magic book franchise

In film and television
Phoebe Aldridge, in the British radio soap opera The Archers
Phoebe Banks, in the Disney film Enchanted
Phoebe Bright, in the Australian soap opera Neighbours
Phoebe Buffay, a main character in the NBC sitcom Friends, portrayed by Lisa Kudrow
Phoebe Farragut, in the animated television series James Bond Jr.
Phoebe Figalilly, the mystical governess and nanny in the television series Nanny and the Professor
Phoebe Forrester, daughter of Ridge and Taylor in the soap opera The Bold and the Beautiful
Phoebe Furchester-Fuzz, one of the main characters on The Furchester Hotel
Phoebe Halliwell, a witch, one of the main characters on the television drama series Charmed, portrayed by Alyssa Milano
Phoebe Heyerdahl, one of the main characters of the animated television series Hey Arnold!
Phoebe Lichten, the main character of the film Phoebe in Wonderland
Phoebe McQueen, in the British soap opera Hollyoaks
Phoebe Nicholson, in the Australian soap opera Home and Away
Phoebe North, in the 2005 remake of Yours, Mine and Ours
Phoebe O'Hara, in Kindergarten Cop, portrayed by Pamela Reed
Phoebe Sparrow, née Bamford, Gary Sparrow's girlfriend and later wife in the television series Goodnight Sweetheart
Phoebe Terese, one of the girls in Ms. Frizzle's class on the PBS animated television series The Magic School Bus
Phoebe Thunderman, one of the title characters of Nickelodeon's comedy series The Thundermans
Phoebe, main character in American Ultra, portrayed by Kristen Stewart
Phoebe, a character in Cartoon Network's OK K.O.! Let's Be Heroes
Phoebe, from the "'Monster Clubhouse'" segment of Sesame Street
Phoebe, one of the three Weird Sisters in the animated television series Gargoyles, said to represent Grace
Phoebe, in the television series Lovesick
Phoebe, in the Canadian animated television series Kid vs. Kat
Phoebe (Flame Princess) in the animated television series Adventure Time

In games
Phoebe, a character from Square's Final Fantasy Mystic Quest video game
Phoebe (Pokémon), a member of the Hoenn Elite Four from Pokémon
Phoibe, a character in Assassin's Creed Odyssey
Phoebe, a character from Animal Crossing, A sisterly Ostrich who resembles a Phoenix.
Phoebe, a character from Rimworld. One of the three original storytellers.

Toys
 Phoebe, a doll in the Groovy Girls line by Manhattan Toy
 Phoebe, a Bratz character

Other
 Phoebe Howell, in the comic strip Phoebe and Her Unicorn
Phoebe Snow (character), a woman who served as the main character of a turn-of-the-century ad campaign for the Lackawanna Railroad in Pennsylvania
Phoebe D'Ysquith, a character from the stage musical comedy A Gentleman's Guide to Love and Murder

See also
Phoebe (disambiguation)

References

Phoebe
English feminine given names
Given names derived from birds
Given names of Greek language origin